Théodore Drouhet (April 4, 1817 – October 18, 1904) was Governor General for Inde française in the Second French Colonial Empire under Third Republic.

References
 Théodore Drouhet at Senate of France 
 

1817 births
1904 deaths
French Senators of the Third Republic
Governors of French India
Senators of Réunion